Helium production in the United States totaled 73 million cubic meters in 2014. The US was the world's largest helium producer, providing 40 percent of world supply. In addition, the US federal government sold 30 million cubic meters from storage. Other major helium producers were Algeria and Qatar. 

All commercial helium is recovered from natural gas. Helium usually makes up a minuscule portion of natural gas, but can make up as much as 10 percent of natural gas in some fields. A helium content of 0.3 percent or more is considered necessary for commercial helium extraction. In 2012, helium was recovered at 16 extraction plants, from gas wells in Colorado, Kansas, Oklahoma, Texas, and Wyoming. One extraction plant in Utah was idle in 2012.

History

In 1903, an oil exploration well at Dexter, Kansas, produced a gas that would not burn. Kansas state geologist Erasmus Haworth took samples of the gas back to the University of Kansas at Lawrence where chemists Hamilton Cady and David McFarland discovered that gas contained 1.84 percent helium. This led to further discoveries of helium-bearing natural gas in Kansas.

The military was interested in helium for balloons and dirigibles. The US Army built the first helium extraction plant in 1915 at Petrolia, Texas, where a large natural gas field averaged nearly 1 percent helium. The United States Navy established three experimental helium plants during World War I, to recover enough helium to supply barrage balloons with the non-flammable, lighter-than-air gas. Two of the experimental plants were north of Fort Worth, Texas, and recovered helium from natural gas piped in from the Petrolia oil field in Clay County, Texas.

The Mineral Leasing Act of 1920, which provided for oil and gas leasing on federal land, reserved all helium contained in natural gas on federal land to the government.

During World War II, military demand for helium rose, so the federal government built a number of new helium extraction plants. One such plant was at Shiprock, New Mexico, to recover helium from gas at the Rattlesnake Field. Gas from the Rattlesnake field, like that of a number of other fields in the Four Corners area, contained mostly nitrogen and very little hydrocarbons, and was produced exclusively for the helium.

The Helium Acts Amendments of 1960 (Public Law 86–777) empowered the U.S. Bureau of Mines to arrange for five private plants to recover helium from natural gas. The Bureau also built a  pipeline from Bushton, Kansas, to connect those plants with the government's partially depleted Cliffside gas field, near Amarillo, Texas. The crude helium (50 percent to 80 percent helium) was injected and stored in the Cliffside gas field until needed, when it then was further purified.

By 1995, a billion cubic meters of the gas had been stored, but the reserve was US$1.4 billion in debt, prompting the Congress of the United States in 1996 to phase out the reserve. The resulting "Helium Privatization Act of 1996" (Public Law 104–273) directed the United States Department of the Interior to empty the reserve. Sales to government and government contractor began in 1998. Sales to the open market began in 2003. The sales program paid the indebtedness, and is still selling helium.

Geology
All commercial production of helium comes from natural gas. There are two basic types of commercial helium deposits: natural gas produced primarily for the hydrocarbon content, typically containing less than 3 percent helium; and gas with little or no hydrocarbons, produced solely for the helium, which typically makes up between 5 and 10 percent of the gas. Although natural gas in which helium is only a byproduct contains a much lower percentage of helium, historically it has supplied the most helium.

Most geologists believe that the majority of helium in natural gas derives from radioactive decay of uranium and thorium, either from radioactive black shales, or granitoid basement rock. Granite and related rocks tend to contain more uranium and thorium than other rock types. However, some believe that the helium is largely primordial.

Unusual geological conditions are considered necessary for commercial concentrations of helium in natural gas. Helium accumulations are commonly in structural closures overlying bedrock highs. Faults, fractures, and igneous intrusives are regarded by some geologists as important pathways for helium to migrate upward into the sedimentary section. The atomic radius of helium is so small that shale, which is effective in trapping methane, allows the helium to migrate upward through the shale pores. Nonporous caprock such as halite (rock salt) or anhydrite is more effective in trapping helium. Helium deposits occur mostly in Paleozoic rocks. 

High helium content of natural gas is accompanied by high contents of nitrogen and carbon dioxide. The percentage of nitrogen is usually 10 to 20 times that of helium, so that natural gas with 5 percent or more helium may have little or no methane. A representative sample from the Pinta Dome in Apache County, Arizona, for instance, has 8.3 percent helium, 89.9 percent nitrogen, 1 percent carbon dioxide, and only 0.1 percent methane. In such cases, the gas is produced solely for its helium content.

In the early 20th century, the highest production and largest known reserves of helium were in the gases produced for their hydrocarbon content. The most important of these were the Hugoton, Panhandle, Greenwood, and Keyes fields, all located in western Kansas, and the panhandles of Oklahoma and Texas. The Hugoton and Panhandle fields are particularly large, covering thousands of square miles. The helium content of the gas varies greatly within some fields. In the Panhandle field, helium content is highest, up to 1.3 percent or more, along the updip southwest edge, and lowest, 0.1 percent along the northeast edge. 

By 2003, the natural gas fields of the Great Plains of Colorado, Kansas, Oklahoma, and Texas, still held important reserves, but out of 100 BCF of total measured helium reserves in the US, 61 BCF was contained in the Riley Ridge field of western Wyoming, a gas deposit produced for its carbon dioxide content. 

The Four Corners area of the southwest US has a number of gas fields containing 5 to 10 percent helium and large percentages of nitrogen, with little or no hydrocarbons. The fields are associated with igneous intrusions. One field, Dineh-bi-Keyah in Arizona, produced oil from a fractured sill. The other fields have no associated oil. 

Helium-rich gas fields in the United States

Processing

Helium is marketed in two specifications: crude helium, which typically contains 75 percent to 80 percent helium, and Grade A helium, which is 99.995 percent pure.

Storage
A large volume of helium was stored underground in the Cliffside field in the decade following the Helium Act Amendments of 1960. In recent years, the reserve has been systematically selling its helium. , the United States National Helium Reserve still accounted for 30 percent of the world's helium.  The reserve was expected to run out of helium in 2018.

, the storage was listed as:
Government = 2,809,679 Mcf
Private =  2,429,887 Mcf

Trade
The United States is a major exporter of helium.

For many years the United States produced more than 90% of the commercial helium in the world. In the mid-1990s, a new plant in Arzew, Algeria, began producing 17 million cubic meters (600 million cubic feet), enough to supply all of Europe's demand. In 2004–2006, two additional plants, one in Ras Laffan, Qatar, and the other in Skikda, Algeria, were built, and Algeria became the second leading producer of helium. 

In August 2014, the Bureau of Land Management auctioned crude helium from the national reserve at an average price of US$104 per thousand cubic feet of helium content. Grade A helium sold for about $200 per thousand cubic feet, or $7.21 per cubic meter in 2014.

References

United States
Energy in the United States